The 8th Metro Manila Film Festival was held in 1982.

ECP's Himala captured nine awards in the 1982 Metro Manila Film Festival including the Best Picture, Best Director for Ishmael Bernal and Best Actress for Nora Aunor among others. The film also emerged the top grosser of the festival edging FPJ Productions' Ang Panday...Ikatlong Yugto.

Entries

Winners and nominees

Awards
Winners are listed first and highlighted in boldface.

Multiple awards

Commentary

Second Golden Age of Philippine film
The period of the Philippine film's artistic accomplishment begins in 1975 (three years after Ferdinand Marcos' declaration of Martial Law) and ending in the February 1986 People Power Revolution where Marcos lost his power. Nora Aunor's Bona and Himala in 1980 and 1982 respectively (both are official entries of MMFF) achieves to represent the period where the accomplishments of two government institutions contributed to the emergence of New Cinema in the 1970s and 1980s. Her films are cinematically accomplished despite being politically engaged films, and the MMFF is able to make these films flourish during this period.

References

External links

Metro Manila Film Festival
MMFF
MMFF